Cephetola eliasis is a butterfly in the family Lycaenidae. It is found in Cameroon, the Democratic Republic of the Congo and Tanzania.

Subspecies
Cephetola eliasis eliasis (north-western Tanzania)
Cephetola eliasis angustata Libert & Collins, 1999 (Cameroon, Democratic Republic of the Congo)

References

Butterflies described in 1998
Poritiinae